The Pingat Jasa Gemilang is a Singaporean national honour and medal instituted in 1962. It may be awarded to any person who has performed "service of conspicuous merit characterised by resource and devotion to duty, including long service marked by exceptional ability, merit and exemplary conduct within Singapore". It may also be awarded to any person outside of Singapore under exceptional circumstances.

Recipients are entitled to use the post-nominal letters PJG.

The Singapore Armed Forces equivalent of the award is the Pingat Jasa Gemilang (Tentera).

History 
The Pingat Jasa Gemilang was one of six state awards instituted on 19 April 1962. The rules of the award were revised in July 1996.

Description 
 The medal is silver-gilt having, on the obverse side, a rhomboid artifice superimposed upon a multi-perforated base. In the centre of the artifice is a shield bearing a crescent and 5 stars and below it a scroll with the inscription "PINGAT JASA GEMILANG".
 The reverse bears the State arms.
 The ribbon is grey with a red centre band flanked on each side by a white stripe and a thin red stripe.

Award recipients
There are more than 103 recipients of the Pingat Jasa Gemilang since 2020. Several notable recipients include:

References

Civil awards and decorations of Singapore